Brandoa  is a former civil parish, located in the municipality of Amadora, Portugal. In 2013, the parish merged into the new parish Encosta do Sol. It is situated in the outskirts of Lisbon, with 2,39 km² of area and 15,647 inhabitants (2001).

Former parishes of Amadora